Galerie Gmurzynska is a commercial art gallery based in Zurich, Switzerland, specializing in modern and contemporary art and work by the Russian avant-garde. It became a popular venue for international collectors seeking Russian art that was banned by the Soviet regime, and, according to Artnet, became the "go-to place for Russian art for international collectors".

The gallery buys and sells mostly works by modern and contemporary artists. It also sells pieces at art fairs by artists such as Pablo Picasso, Kurt Schwitters, Fernand Léger, Lyonel Feininger, Robert and Sonia Delaunay, Stallone and Fernando Botero. The gallery works with the estates of Yves Klein, Wifredo Lam, Louise Nevelson, and Robert Indiana among others. It also arranged for an exhibition of Sylvester Stallone at the Museum of Modern Art in Nice in 2015 and hosts the artwork of fashion designer Karl Lagerfeld and the architect Richard Meier.

The gallery also publishes books and catalogues for its exhibitions.

History

Early years 1965-1986 
The gallery was founded in 1965 in Cologne, Germany, by Antonina Gmurzynska, a Polish immigrant who worked in a museum before her move. It held an exhibition of Japanese art in its first year. The following year, the gallery presented the work of David Burliuk. Until 1971, the gallery's program focused on the Russian avant-garde. Gallery founder Antonina Gmurzynska developed contacts with the artists' families, and allegedly helped to smuggle artwork that was banned by the Soviet regime out of Russia.

In 1986, Antonina's daughter Krystina took over the business upon her mother's death, together with her business partner (sometimes called the "co-owner") Mathias Rastorfer. Gmurzynska's daughter, Isabelle Bscher, is also involved with the gallery for promotional purposes.

1990s
1993 saw The Other Reality exhibit by Frank Kupka, followed by two exhibits by Yves Klein in 1994 and 1995, named Le Dépassement de la Problématique de l'Art and The Spiritual in Art respectively. Rebellion Against Form by Joan Miró was exhibited in 1998.

2000s 
Spatial Constructions from Alexander Rodchenko and Naum Gabo were exhibited by the gallery in 2001. An Andy Warhol and Yves Klein exhibit, Natural – Unnatural was shown in 2002.

In 2005, the gallery relocated from Cologne to Switzerland and opened a gallery on Zürich's Paradeplatz. The gallery arranged with the building's owner to restore the facade, built in 1880, to its original style with large windows. The windows are glazed with armoured glass. That same year, the gallery participated in the Art Basel Miami Beach, during which its Yves Klein fire drawing from its Cologne gallery was valued at $1.6 million.

2010s 
In 2010, the gallery held an exhibition entitled Zaha Hadid and Suprematism, which was designed and curated by Hadid and Patrik Schumacher. The installation was designed to be viewed through the gallery's window on Paradeplatz. Works displayed at the exhibition included Kazimir Malevich's Red Square: Painterly Realism of a Peasant Woman in Two Dimension, as well as paintings by Ilya Chashnik and Alexander Rodchenko. The exhibit placed the influence of the Russian artists with Hadid's work. It was the first exhibition to connect Hadid with Suprematism art, according to Wallpaper*.

At the 2014 Art Basel in Miami Beach, to celebrate their 50th anniversary, the gallery's booth was designed by film director Baz Luhrmann, costume designer Catherine Martin and music producer Nellee Hooper. The exhibition was titled A Kid Could Do That! It featured works by twentieth-century artists such as Joan Miró, Kazimir Malevich, Wifredo Lam, Cy Twombly and Fancis Bacon.

In February 2016, the gallery exhibited CHRISTO & Jeanne-Claude - Works in Progress. Known mainly for their large-scale outdoor installations, the works shown in the gallery were part of projects including The Mastaba (Abu Dhabi), Over the River (Colorado), and Floating Piers (Lake Iseo in Northern Italy) represented through sketches, drawings and photo collages.

The gallery had an exhibition of Robert Indiana's work in December 2014. During August 2016, the gallery held 20th Century American Masters, highlighting the influence of 20th century American artists, with works of Robert Indiana as well. October 2016 saw the Mel Ramos exhibit spanning his entire career at the Zug branch.

In 2017, the gallery exhibited the personal art collection of Italian automotive heir Jean Pigozzi, consisting mostly of sub-Saharan African works.

In 2018, Bulgarian-born artist Christo presented the only remaining works related to the failed 1968 wrapping of the MoMA at the gallery.

Controversies

1993 smuggling of Nikolai Khardzhiev collection 
The Galerie was involved in moving a major collection of documents, drawings and paintings by Russian Futurist artists estimated at around £100 million, belonging to Nikolai Khardzhiev and his wife Lidia Chaga, from Moscow to Amsterdam. In 1993, Krystyna Gmurzynska and Mathias Rastorfer visited the Khardzhievs in Moscow, and signed agreements described by Rastorfer as “letters of intent” over $2.5 million in exchange for six works of Malevich art worth $30 million. The gallery arranged the packing and removal of the artworks, but then left the Khadzhievs in Amsterdam and cut off communications with them while retaining control of their collections. As reported in articles published in The New York Times and the New Left Review, the Khardzhievs were duped.

Edelman v Gmurzynska insurance dispute 
Between 2007 and 2009, Gmurzynska and Rastorfer were involved in a further dispute.  Dealer Asher B. Edelman loaned a work to Gmurzynska that was returned damaged. Gmurzynska and Rastorfer ignored the claim. In 2009, a U.S. district court judge awarded Edelman a default judgment of $765,000 to which Gmurzynska and Rastorfer failed to respond, leading four of the Gmurzynska's paintings to be seized at the Miami Beach Art Fair and held for two days until the gallery paid the judgment. Edelman was awarded an additional $250,000 for what the judge described as the gallery's "wilful conduct" in the matter, i.e. their failure to respond to the lawsuit. Gmurzynska and Rastorfer disputed any wrongdoing, stating that "The gallery never received any notice that Mr. Edelman had applied for a default judgment".

2013 Hotel Dolder VAT evasion and gallery raid by Swiss Customs 
In 2013, the gallery was raided by the Swiss Federal Customs Administration regarding VAT on imported artworks worth 85M Swiss Francs supplied by the Gmurzynska gallery to the Dolder Grand Hotel, owned by Urs Schwarzenbach.  Documents and computers were seized as evidence  while the Hotel Dolder was subject to a simultaneous raid.  Gmurzynska filed a complaint in order to prevent their inspection, but the Federal Court has ruled that in a criminal investigation of this kind where there is reasonable suspicion, the prosecuting FCA can demand to see papers it considers relevant to the case.  The evidence made available to journalists indicates that a sham company issuing fake bills was used to import the works via a bonded warehouse, enabling Schwarzenbach to avoid paying the required import duty.  The case was reported in Zurich's leading newspaper, the Neue Zürcher Zeitung.

2018 hiring of Benjamin Genocchio
In 2018, Gmurzynska Gallery drew attention when Benjamin Genocchio became a partner, serving as vice president at the Gallery's New York branch. Genocchio was previously replaced as director of the Armory Show after multiple complaints of sexual harassment.

Artists
Exhibited artists have included:

Igor Baskakov
Rudolf Bauer
Fernando Botero
Anatol Brusilovsky
Ronnie Cutrone
Boris Ender
Maria Ender
Xenia Ender
Haas Brothers
Zaha Hadid
Robert Indiana
Allen Jones
Yves Klein
Robert Klippel
Frank Kupka
Karl Lagerfeld
Wifredo Lam
Mikhail Larionov
Jani Leinonen
Kazimir Malevich
Richard Meier
Joan Miró
Louise Nevelson
Pablo Picasso
Alexander Rodchenko
Rotraut
Kurt Schwitters
David Smith
Sylvester Stallone
Varvara Stepanova
Nikolai Suetin
Tom Wesselmann

Selected bibliography
Kurt Schwitters: Merz (2016)
Robert Indiana: To Russia With Love (2016)
Christo and Jeanne-Claude: Works in Progress (2016)
Sylvester Stallone: Véritable Amour. Peintures 1975-2015 (2015)
BoteroSutra (2014)
A Kid Could Do That! (2014)
Robert Indiana: 50 Years of LOVE, Monumental Sculptures at 45 Park Lane (2014)
Richard Meier: Timepieces (2014)
Karl Lagerfeld (2013)
Zaha Hadid and Suprematism (2012)
Wifredo Lam (2012)

References

External links

Art museums and galleries in Switzerland